Paracanthostracion lindsayi is a species of boxfish endemic to New Zealand. This species is the only known member of its genus.

References

Ostraciidae
Fish described in 1932